William Watson Small (19 October 1909 – 18 January 1978) was a Scottish Labour Party politician.

Small was an engineer. He was an Ayrshire County Councillor from 1945 to 1951 and an active member of the Amalgamated Engineering Union, serving on its national committee from 1955 to 1957 and as president of the union's West Ayrshire district.

At the 1959 general election, he was elected as Member of Parliament for Glasgow Scotstoun.  He held the seat until it was abolished for the February 1974 election, when he moved to the new Glasgow Garscadden constituency. He held that seat until his death in London on 18 January 1978, aged 68.

Small never held ministerial office, but served as Parliamentary Private Secretary to the Minister of Power from 1964.

References

External links 

1909 births
1978 deaths
20th-century Scottish engineers
Amalgamated Engineering Union-sponsored MPs
Members of the Parliament of the United Kingdom for Glasgow constituencies
Scottish Labour MPs
Scottish Labour councillors
UK MPs 1959–1964
UK MPs 1964–1966
UK MPs 1966–1970
UK MPs 1970–1974
UK MPs 1974
UK MPs 1974–1979